Greycliffe is a rural locality in the Shire of Banana, Queensland, Australia.

Geography 
It is part of the Banana Range. This area is within the Overdeen State Forest. This eastern land is predominantly used for grazing on native vegetation with some cropping.

History 
Greycliffe State School opened on 11 November 1935. It closed on 17 December 1993. It was on the corner of Belldeen Greycliffe Road and Prospect Creek Goovigen Road, now over the boundary into Orange Creek.

Education 
There are no schools in Greycliffe. The nearest primary schools are Goovigen State School in neighbouring Goovigen to the north, Jambin State School in neighbouring Jambin to the east, Prospect Creek State School in Prospect to the south-east and Banana State School in Banana to the south-west. The nearest secondary school is Biloela State High School in Biloela to the south-east.

References

Further reading 

  — includes Greycliffe State School

Shire of Banana
Localities in Queensland